Gavin Harrap Fryer is a British philatelist who signed the Roll of Distinguished Philatelists in 2011.

He was President of the Royal Philatelic Society from 2000 to 2003.

References

British philatelists
Signatories to the Roll of Distinguished Philatelists
Living people
Year of birth missing (living people)
Presidents of the Royal Philatelic Society London